Comes and Goes is the fourth and final studio album by Canadian hard rock band Default. It was released on September 29, 2009 in Canada and internationally on October 26, 2010.  The band has released four singles from the album: "All Over Me", "Little Too Late", "Turn It On", and "Supposed to Be", all released exclusively in Canada. The music video for "All Over Me" was released on September 21, 2009. Comes and Goes debuted at  137 on the Billboard 200 chart.

Content
Comes and Goes was originally going to be released on TVT Records, which went bankrupt in 2008. As a result, the band underwent several court cases before EMI Canada licensed the rights to the album. Label executives made the decision because they felt that Default was more financially viable than other TVT acts.

Critical reception
Rating it two-and-a-half stars out of five, Christopher Tessmer of The Leader-Post thought that "Caught in the Moment" was one of the band's best songs, but otherwise found the album's sound "formulaic".

Track listing

Bonus tracks

Personnel
Bryan Coleman - Management
Default - Composer, Primary Artist
Marti Frederiksen - Composer
Keith Gretlein - Assistant
Leonard B. Johnson - A&R
Ted Jensen - Mastering
Ralph James  - Booking (Canada)
Steve Kaul - Booking (United States)
Zac Maloy - Composer
Bob Marlette - Composer, Engineer, Mixing, Producer
Richard Marx - Composer
Mark Maryanovich - Photography
Antoine Moonen - Package Design
Sid Riggs - Digital Editing, Editing

Charts

References

2009 albums
Default (band) albums